Libor Hudáček (born 7 September 1990) is a Slovak ice hockey player currently under contract with HC Oceláři Třinec of the Czech Extraliga (ELH). He is the younger brother of Július Hudáček, who is a goaltender.

Playing career
Hudáček began playing junior ice hockey in the HK Spišská Nová Ves. He was a member of the HK Orange 20 project in the 2009–10 season, overall playing 23 games. Rest of the season, he played for the HC Slovan Bratislava. In the 2010–11 season he overall played 55 games and earned 24 points for Slovan. In the next season, he scored the winning goal in the 7th playoffs final game against HC Košice and won the Slovak Extraliga title.

After two seasons with HC Bílí Tygři Liberec in the Czech Extraliga (ELH), Hudáček returned to the KHL as a free agent, signing a one-year contract with Neftekhimik Nizhnekamsk on 21 May 2020.

On February 24, 2021, Hudacek joined Lausanne HC of the National League (NL) on a one-year deal through the end of the 2020–21 season. He hurt his leg in a game against EHC Biel on March 9, 2021, which required surgery, forcing him to sit out the remainder of the season.

On 31 July 2022, Hudáček opted to return to Czechia as a free agent and signed a three-year contract with HC Oceláři Třinec of the ELH.

International play

Hudáček participated at the 2008 IIHF World U18 Championships and the 2010 World Junior Ice Hockey Championships. He played for Slovakia at the 2012 IIHF World Championship, earning 5 points in 10 games. He won the silver medal at the 2012 World Championship.

Career statistics

Regular season and playoffs

International

References

External links

1990 births
Living people
HC '05 Banská Bystrica players
HC Bílí Tygři Liberec players
Färjestad BK players
Lausanne HC players
People from Levoča
Sportspeople from the Prešov Region
HC Neftekhimik Nizhnekamsk players
Slovak ice hockey forwards
HC Dinamo Minsk players
HC Izhstal players
HC Lugano players
HC Oceláři Třinec players
HC Slovan Bratislava players
HK Spišská Nová Ves players
Örebro HK players
Ice hockey players at the 2022 Winter Olympics
Olympic ice hockey players of Slovakia
Medalists at the 2022 Winter Olympics
Olympic bronze medalists for Slovakia
Olympic medalists in ice hockey
Slovak expatriate ice hockey players in Sweden
Slovak expatriate ice hockey players in the Czech Republic
Slovak expatriate ice hockey players in Russia
Slovak expatriate ice hockey players in Switzerland
Expatriate ice hockey players in Belarus
Slovak expatriate sportspeople in Belarus